Heptaxodontidae, rarely called giant hutia, is an extinct family of large rodents known from fossil and subfossil material found in the West Indies. This is twice as large as the capybara, the largest rodent living today, but still much smaller than Josephoartigasia monesi, the largest rodent known. These animals were probably used as a food source by the pre-Columbian peoples of the Caribbean. 

Heptaxodontidae contains no living species and the grouping seems to be paraphyletic and arbitrary, however. One of the smaller species, Quemisia gravis, may have survived as late as when the Spanish began to colonize the Caribbean.

Despite the vernacular name, heptaxodontids are not closely related to the extant hutias of the family Echimyidae; Heptaxodontids are thought to be more closely related to the chinchillas.

Taxonomy 
Heptaxodontidae is divided into two subfamilies and contains six species in five genera.

Family Heptaxodontidae
Subfamily Heptaxodontinae
Genus Amblyrhiza
Amblyrhiza inundata from Anguilla and St. Martin
Genus Elasmodontomys
Elasmodontomys obliquus from Puerto Rico
Genus Quemisia
Quemisia gravis from Hispaniola
Genus Xaymaca
Xaymaca fulvopulvis from Jamaica
Subfamily Clidomyinae
Genus Clidomys
Clidomys osborni from Jamaica

See also 
 Island gigantism

References

Bibliography 
 Biknevicius, A. R.; McFarlane, Donald A. & MacPhee, R. D. E. (1993): Body size in Amblyrhiza inundata (Rodentia: Caviomorpha), an extinct megafaunal rodent from the Anguilla Bank, West Indies: estimates and implications. American Museum Novitates 3079: 1-26. PDF fulltext
 MacPhee, R. D. E. & Flemming, C. (2003): A possible heptaxodontine and other caviidan rodents from the Quaternary of Jamaica. American Museum Novitates 3422: 1-42. PDF fulltext
 Nowak, Ronald M. 1999. Walker's Mammals of the World, 6th edition. Johns Hopkins University Press, 1936 
 Woods, C. A. 1989. Biogeography of West Indian rodents.  Pages 741–797 in Biogeography of the West Indies: Past Present and Future. Sandhill Crane Press, Gainesville.
 

 
Hystricognath rodents
Fossils of the Caribbean
Holocene extinctions
Pleistocene first appearances
Fossil taxa described in 1917
Prehistoric rodent families